The 1983 Balearic regional election was held on Sunday, 8 May 1983, to elect the 1st Parliament of the autonomous community of the Balearic Islands. All 54 seats in the Parliament were up for election. The election was held simultaneously with regional elections in twelve other autonomous communities and local elections all throughout Spain.

The regional picture, at first glance, had been dominated by the Union of the Democratic Centre (UCD), heading the pre-autonomic government since 1978 and having won the 1979 elections to the Mallorca and Menorca Island Councils. However, the UCD was dissolved in early 1983 after its disastrous defeat in the 1982 Spanish general election, with its supporters fleeing to the People's Alliance (AP), the People's Democratic Party (PDP) or, as one of its erstwhile leaders, the newly founded Majorcan Union (UM). Other parties which had also contested the Island Council elections four years previously were the regional branch of the Spanish Socialist Workers' Party (PSOE), the Socialist Party of Majorca (PSM) or the Communist Party of the Balearic Islands (PCIB).

The election resulted in a tie at 21 seats between the People's Coalition—formed by AP, the PDP and the Liberal Union (UL)—and the PSOE, with a narrow overall victory for the centre-right parties. AP candidate Gabriel Cañellas was able to access the regional government through the support of UM—which had obtained 6 seats—and the votes from the Liberal Democratic Party (PDL) and the Menorcan Independent Candidacy (CIM).

Overview

Electoral system
The Parliament of the Balearic Islands was the devolved, unicameral legislature of the autonomous community of the Balearic Islands, having legislative power in regional matters as defined by the Spanish Constitution and the Balearic Statute of Autonomy, as well as the ability to vote confidence in or withdraw it from a regional president.

Transitory Provision Second of the Statute established a specific electoral procedure for the first election to the Parliament of the Balearic Islands, to be supplemented by the provisions within Royal Decree-Law 20/1977, of 18 March, and its related regulations. Voting for the Parliament was on the basis of universal suffrage, which comprised all nationals over 18 years of age, registered in the Balearic Islands and in full enjoyment of their political rights. The 54 members of the Parliament of the Balearic Islands were elected using the D'Hondt method and a closed list proportional representation, with an electoral threshold of three percent of valid votes—which included blank ballots—being applied in each constituency. Seats were allocated to constituencies, corresponding to the islands of Mallorca, Menorca, Ibiza and Formentera, with each being allocated a fixed number of seats: 30 for Mallorca, 12 for Menorca, 11 for Ibiza and 1 for Formentera.

The use of the D'Hondt method might result in a higher effective threshold, depending on the district magnitude.

Election date
The Inter-island General Council, in agreement with the Government of Spain, was required to call an election to the Parliament of the Balearic Islands before 31 May 1983. In the event of an investiture process failing to elect a regional president within a sixty-day period from the first ballot, the Parliament was to be automatically dissolved and a snap election called, with elected deputies merely serving out what remained of their four-year terms.

Parties and candidates
The electoral law allowed for parties and federations registered in the interior ministry, coalitions and groupings of electors to present lists of candidates. Parties and federations intending to form a coalition ahead of an election were required to inform the relevant Electoral Commission within fifteen days of the election call, whereas groupings of electors needed to secure the signature of at least one-thousandth of the electorate in the constituencies for which they sought election—with a compulsory minimum of 500 signatures—disallowing electors from signing for more than one list of candidates.

Below is a list of the main parties and electoral alliances which contested the election:

The electoral disaster of the Union of the Democratic Centre (UCD) in the October 1982 general election and the outcome of its extraordinary congress held in December, in which the party's leadership chose to transform the UCD into a christian democratic political force, brought the party to a process of virtual disintegration as many of its remaining members either switched party allegiances, split into new, independent candidacies or left politics altogether. Subsequent attempts to seek electoral allies ahead of the incoming 1983 local and regional elections, mainly the conservative People's Alliance (AP) and the christian democratic People's Democratic Party (PDP), had limited success due to concerns from both AP and UCD over such an alliance policy: AP strongly rejected any agreement that implied any sort of global coalition with UCD due to the party's ongoing decomposition, and prospects about a possible PDP–UCD merger did not come into fruition because of the latter's reluctance to dilute its brand within another party. In Mallorca, the former president of the Inter-island General Council, Jeroni Albertí, led the formation of the regionalist coalition Majorcan Union (UM) as a continuation of UCD on the island.

Together with AP, the PDP had agreed to maintain their general election alliance—now rebranded as the People's Coalition—for the May local and regional elections, with the inclusion of the Liberal Union (UL), a political party created in January 1983 out of independents from the AP–PDP coalition in an attempt to appeal to former UCD liberal voters. The Coalition had seen its numbers soar from late February as a result of many former members from the UCD's christian democratic wing joining the PDP.

Opinion polls
The tables below list opinion polling results in reverse chronological order, showing the most recent first and using the dates when the survey fieldwork was done, as opposed to the date of publication. Where the fieldwork dates are unknown, the date of publication is given instead. The highest percentage figure in each polling survey is displayed with its background shaded in the leading party's colour. If a tie ensues, this is applied to the figures with the highest percentages. The "Lead" column on the right shows the percentage-point difference between the parties with the highest percentages in a poll.

Voting intention estimates
The table below lists weighted voting intention estimates. Refusals are generally excluded from the party vote percentages, while question wording and the treatment of "don't know" responses and those not intending to vote may vary between polling organisations. When available, seat projections determined by the polling organisations are displayed below (or in place of) the percentages in a smaller font; 28 seats were required for an absolute majority in the Parliament of the Balearic Islands.

Voting preferences
The table below lists raw, unweighted voting preferences.

Results

Overall

Distribution by constituency

Aftermath

See also
Results breakdown of the 1983 Spanish local elections (Balearic Islands)

Notes

References
Opinion poll sources

Other

1983 in the Balearic Islands
Balearic Islands
Regional elections in the Balearic Islands
May 1983 events in Europe